The St. John's Jr. 50's were a Canadian Junior ice hockey club from St. John's, Newfoundland and Labrador.  They were members of the St. John's Junior Hockey League, the first ever 3-time Don Johnson Cup Atlantic Junior B Champions and one-time Newfoundland Junior A Champions.

History
In 1980, the St. John's Junior Hockey League was formed.  Prior to 1980, there was a junior town-league that was not of a very high caliber.  The SJJHL became one of the stronger Atlantic junior leagues in the 1980s, with the 50's leading the way by becoming the first 3-time Atlantic Junior B Champion.

In the old city league, the team was known as the St. John's Jr. Blue Caps, but gained a sponsorship from Labatt Breweries in 1980.  In 1979-80, the Jr. Blue Caps lost only once and were winners of the Veitch Memorial Trophy as provincial champions.

In the summer of 1980, new St. John's League President Danny Williams would not allow them to adopt a beer sponsored name, so they were known as the St. John's Guards after the Guards Athletic Association until 1982 when they became the Jr. 50's.

In their second season as the Jr. 50's, the 50's lost the final to the St. John's Jr. Shamrocks, but met them again in the Veitch Memorial Trophy final for the right to move on to the Don Johnson Cup and beat them 6-5.

By their third season, the 50's had won their first league title, their second Veitch Memorial Trophy in a round robin against the St. John's Jr. Shamrocks, and then their first Don Johnson Cup by defeating the Northumberland Junior B Hockey League's Antigonish Bulldogs in the final.

In 1987, two seasons later, the 50's won their second league title, again won the Veitch Memorial Trophy as Newfoundland Junior Champions, and then the Windsor Valley Jets 9-5 in the Don Johnson Cup final to clinch their second Atlantic Championship.

In 1988, they made it a third league title and Atlantic Championship to cap off a memorable run.

In 1989, the St. John's Junior Hockey League was promoted to Junior A.  In the process, the league shrunk from eight to an elite four team league.  The 50's survived this process.  The 50's won the 1991 SJJHL title to become Newfoundland Junior A champions.  As they moved on into National Playdowns, they competed against the Metro Valley Junior Hockey League's Halifax Canadians for the J. Pius Callaghan Cup Atlantic Junior A Championship.  The Canadians swept the 50's in four games to end their Centennial Cup run.

The summer of 1991 saw the SJJHL return to Junior B.  The 50's won league titles in 1992 and 1993.  In the summer of 1993, the 50's ceased operations and were replaced by the St. John's Jr. Caps.

Season-by-season record

External links
SJJHL Website

Defunct Ice hockey teams in Newfoundland and Labrador
Sport in St. John's, Newfoundland and Labrador
1979 establishments in Newfoundland and Labrador
Ice hockey clubs established in 1979
1993 disestablishments in Newfoundland and Labrador
Sports clubs disestablished in 1993